The Missio(n) sui iuris of Gazireh was a short-lived (1935-53) Latin Catholic missionary pre-diocesan jurisdiction sui iuris in part of Asian Turkey, based on the Ancient city and former see of Gazireh.

History 
Established in 1935 as Mission sui juris of Gazireh (Gezira), exempt, i.e. directly dependent on the Holy See, not part of any ecclesiastical province.

Suppressed in 1953, having had a single recorded incumbent as Ecclesiastical Superior of Gazireh :
 Father Francesco Drapier, Dominican Order (O.P.) (1935 – 1941)

See also 
Eastern Catholic dioceses
 Gazireh of the Chaldeans
 Gazireh of the Syrians

References

External links 
 GCatholic

Missions sui iuris
Former Roman Catholic dioceses in Asia